National Route 121 is a national road in Argentina, running East in Corrientes.

Main Points

 km 2.2: access to Santo Tomé
 km 5.3: toll booth
 km 5.5: border crossing and immigration booth
 km 7.6: international bridge

The road was built in 1997 by the Mercovias company along with the international bridge in a 25-year public lease.

National roads in Corrientes Province
Tourism in Argentina